Vitaliy Bubon (born July 20, 1983) is a Ukrainian judoka.

Achievements

External links
 
 Judo videos of Vitaliy Bubon in action (judovision.org)

1983 births
Living people
Ukrainian male judoka
Judoka at the 2004 Summer Olympics
Olympic judoka of Ukraine